Eleonora Luthander (née Damjanović; 9 February 1954 - 25 August 2021), born in Kruševac, Yugoslavia, was a Swedish and Serbian poet, columnist and translator.

Biography 
Luthander studied at the Faculty of Economics in Belgrade. Between 1986 and 1994 she lived on the Adriatic island of Hvar in Croatia where she made her debut as a writer in 1993 with the book Žvončići sreće.

She has published over 30 books and translations partly through her Swedish book publisher Ord & Visor. She has translated contemporary Swedish poets in Serbian; Kristina Lugn, Bruno K. Öijer, Lukas Moodysson and Ulf Lundell and haiku poetry from Dag Hammarskjöld. Her poetry collections Diktogram and Vägen till Gdinj (Road to Gdinj) are listed in the Swedish Academy's Nobel Library.

Luthander was a member of the Swedish Writers Association and the Swedish Immigrant Writers Association, later renamed the Swedish International Writers Association. She worked as a columnist for the magazine Sesam Öppnar Dörrar.

She often participated in poetry slam competitions in Sweden, both as a contestant and as an organizer. Luthander often drew inspiration from Japan; several of her published works are Japanese short poems, haiku. Luthander folded origami flowers and wrote her poems on stalks. She brought haiku, origami and ikebana together into her own Orikebana.

She was married to the Swedish journalist Per Luthander between 1975 and 1986. She has a daughter and a son, they both live in Stockholm.

Style 
Her poems are often described with sense of joy and energy. The poetry is straightforward and unadorned as stylistic for poets such as Märta Tikkanen, Kristina Lugn and Bodil Malmsten. Luthander's poems are unsentimental and the imagery is original and sometimes drastic.

Bibliography

Collection of poems in Swedish 

 1998 - Vägen till Gdinj
 1999 - Angantyr, 
 2000 - Måncykel, 
 2002 - 100% kärlek, 
 2003 - Öfvre Östermalm, 
 2005 - 33 blommor för Sandjusangendo, 
 2007 - Diktogram, 
 2010 - Kranvatten, 
 2014 - Dubai haiku, diktsamling, 
 2017 - Orikebana, 
 2020 - Klimat haiku, 
 2021 - Ökenhörna,

Collection of poems in other languages 
Croatian, Serbian & Montenegrin

 1993 - Žvončići sreće, Split
 1994 - Put u Gdinj, Split
 2005 - Minut ćutanja, Belgrade, 
 2005 - Hvarska prigovaranja, Belgrade, 
 2006 - Ikebana, haiku, Belgrade, 
 2006 - Mojim ustima, Belgrade, 
 2008 - Kapital, Stockholm, 
 2009 - Medovina, Podgorica, 
 2011 - Česmovača, Stockholm
 2012 - Cmokva, Podgorica
 2015 - Ela Čevska, Podgorica, 
 2019 - Haiku bento, Stockholm

Translations

From Swedish to Serbo-Croatian 

 2005 - Dovidjenja i srećno! (Hej då ha det så bra!), Kristina Lugn, Belgrade
 2006 - Izgubljena reč, (Det Förlorade Ordet), Bruno K. Öijer, Belgrade
 2006 - Izmedju 16 i 26, (Mellan sexton och tjugosex), Lukas Moodysson, Belgrade
 2007 - Vreme za ljubav, (Tid för kärlek), Ulf Lundell, Belgrade
 2009 - Vrijeme za ljubav (Tid för kärlek), Ulf Lundell, "UKCG", Podgorica
 2013 - Bergman i žene (Bergman och kvinnor), Alexandra Luthander, Stockholm

From Serbo-Croatian to Swedish 

 2005 - Ögat är större än himmelen, serbiska poeter jag har mött (Oko je prostranije od neba, srpski pesnici koje sam upoznala), e book, "Serum.se", Stockholm
 2005 - Ögat är större än himmelen, (Poeziju će svi pisati), "Gatos", Belgrade
 2007 - Alla skall skriva poesi 2, (Poeziju će svi pisati 2), Stockholm
 2008 - Alla skall skriva poesi 3, (Poeziju će svi pisati 3), Stockholm
 2008 - Alla skall skriva poesi: serbiska poeter jag mött, (Poeziju će svi pisati: srpski pesnici koje sam upoznala), e book, "Serum.se", Stockholm
 2010 - Brev från Serbien (Pisma iz Srbije), Slobodan Branković, Stockholm

References

1954 births
Living people
20th-century Swedish writers
21st-century Swedish writers
Serbian women poets